William Arthur Evans (August 3, 1911 – January 8, 1952) was a Major League Baseball pitcher who played for the Chicago White Sox in .

External links

1911 births
1952 deaths
Chicago White Sox players
Major League Baseball pitchers
Baseball players from Missouri
People from Park Hills, Missouri